Bergera is a genus of flowering plants in the family Rutaceae. It has been included in Murraya as M. sect. Bergera. Species that may be placed in the genus are native from India through southeast Asia eastwards to China and Taiwan southwards to Malesia and New Caledonia. The curry tree, Bergera koenigii, is one of the better known species.

Taxonomy
The genus name Bergera was first published by Johann Gerhard König in 1771. Bergera was accepted as a separate genus 
for several decades after König's description, but was later united with the genus Murraya (for which Bergera had been rejected as a name). In 1986, Paul P.-H. But and co-authors separated off some species of Murraya as M. sect. Bergera based on chemical evidence. The later creation of a separate genus for the section was further supported by evidence from pollen morphology in 2009 and molecular phylogenetic evidence in 2017. The genus is accepted in a 2021 classification of the family Rutaceae, which was based on a major molecular phylogenetic study of the family. , Plants of the World Online continues to unite it with Murraya.

Species
The genus is reported to contain ten or more species. Species of Murraya that may be placed in Murrya sect. Bergera and hence in Bergera include:
Murraya crenulata (Turcz.) Oliv.
Murraya euchrestifolia Hayata
Murraya koenigii (L.) Spreng., syn. Bergera koenigii L.
Murraya kwangsiensis (C.C.Huang) C.C.Huang
Murraya microphylla (Merr. & Chun) Swingle
Murraya siamensis Craib
Murraya tetramera C.C.Huang

Distribution
Species that may be placed in Bergera are native from India through southeast Asia (including China) to Taiwan, Malesia and New Caledonia.

References

Aurantioideae
Aurantioideae genera